Craighead County is a county located in the U.S. state of Arkansas. As of the 2020 census, the population was 111,231. The county has two county seats — Jonesboro and Lake City. Craighead County is Arkansas's 58th county, formed on February 19, 1859, and named for state Senator Thomas Craighead. It is one of several dry counties within the state of Arkansas, in which the sale of alcoholic beverages is largely prohibited.

Craighead County is included in Jonesboro–Paragould Combined Statistical Area.

History
Craighead County was part of the territory claimed for France on April 9, 1682, by René Robert Cavelier, Sieur de La Salle, who laid claim to all of the land drained by the Mississippi River and its tributaries. LaSalle's claim was named Louisiana in honor of Louis XIV, King of France.

The Treaty of Fontainebleau (1762) was signed between France and Spain and ownership of the Louisiana territory west of the Mississippi River was transferred to the Spanish crown as a result of the Seven Years' War and Craighead County became a Spanish possession.

Spain controlled of the territory encompassing the county until October 1, 1800, when Napoleon Bonaparte forced Spain to return the lost territories to France under the Treaty of Ildefonso. Napoleon maintained grandiose plans to establish a vast French Empire in Louisiana but the Royal Navy prevented him from transferring troops or settlers to the acquired territories.

Fear was high in the United States that Napoleon would attempt to close the Mississippi River to American trade. President Thomas Jefferson inquired about purchasing an area near the mouth of the river to ensure that it would stay open to American goods. Napoleon, needing money, offered to sell the United States the entire territory of Louisiana for $23,213,568.

The treaty was finalized in 1803 and the land that would become Craighead County became the possession of the United States.

Craighead County remained in the Louisiana Territory until the State of Louisiana was admitted to the Union. At that time the territory that includes modern day Arkansas was attached to the Missouri Territory.

In 1813 the area was included in a new political subdivision known as Arkansas County which was a political subdivision of the Arkansas District of the Territory of Missouri. In 1815 the county was further subdivided and Lawrence County was formed with its seat at Davidsonville. This new county included most of what is now northern Arkansas. The modern Craighead county lay partially within Arkansas County and partially within Lawrence County.

Residents of the Missouri Territory soon began petitioning Congress for admission to the Union.  Their request did not include the District of Arkansas and Arkansas residents petitioned for separate territorial status for their district.  In 1819 the Arkansas Territory was formed.

In 1838, Poinsett County was formed and included most of present-day Craighead County.  This situation persisted until 1850 when residents of the area complained about the distance to the Poinsett County seat.

In 1858 State Senator William A. Jones campaign platform included a promise to seek the formation of a new county for the area.  His election was successful and helped push legislation for the formation of the new county.

The new county was to be formed from lands taken from Greene, Mississippi, and Poinsett counties, and it was to be named "Crowley County" in honor of Crowley's Ridge which runs through the center of the county.

Senator Thomas Craighead represented Mississippi County, and opposed the bill because the farmland it took from Mississippi County (commonly known as the Buffalo Island area) was a major source of property taxes for the county.

One day while Senator Craighead was away from the floor, Senator Jones amended the bill to change the county's name to "Craighead County".  The Senate, thinking it was a compromise, approved the bill as amended; by the time Senator Craighead returned, the bill had already left the Senate, and he took no further action.

Craighead County was officially formed February 19, 1859; in gratitude, the citizens then named the main county seat Jonesboro, for Senator Jones.  (Some sources say the name was actually proposed by Senator Craighead in a resolution.)  Lake City, just across the St. Francis River from the Buffalo Island area, was added as a second county seat in 1883.

In the early 20th century, Clay, Greene, and Craighead counties had sundown town policies forbidding African Americans from living in the area.

Geography
Crowley's Ridge is the county's most prominent geological feature.

Major highways

 Highway 1
 Highway 1 Business
 Highway 18
 Highway 18 Spur
 Highway 69
 Highway 91
 Highway 135
 Highway 139
 Highway 141
 Highway 148
 Highway 158
 Highway 226
 Highway 230
 Highway 349
 Highway 351
 Highway 463

Airport
The region is served by the Jonesboro Municipal Airport.

Adjacent counties
 Greene County (north)
 Dunklin County, Missouri (northeast)
 Mississippi County (east)
 Poinsett County (south)
 Jackson County (west)
 Lawrence County (northwest)

Demographics

2020 census

As of the 2020 United States census, there were 111,231 people, 41,409 households, and 27,829 families residing in the county.

2000 census
As of the 2000 United States Census, there were 82,148 people, 32,301 households, and 22,093 families residing in the county. There were 35,133 housing units at an average density of 49 per square mile (19/km2). The racial makeup of the county was 89.27% White, 7.78% Black or African American, 0.33% Native American, 0.60% Asian, 0.02% Pacific Islander, 0.93% from other races, and 1.06% from two or more races.  2.12% of the population were Hispanic or Latino of any race.

There were 32,301 households, out of which 32.30% had children under the age of 18 living with them, 53.30% were married couples living together, 11.40% had a female householder with no husband present, and 31.60% were non-families. 25.20% of all households were made up of individuals, and 9.10% had someone living alone who was 65 years of age or older.  The average household size was 2.46 and the average family size was 2.96.

In the county, the population was spread out, with 24.10% under the age of 18, 14.00% from 18 to 24, 28.70% from 25 to 44, 21.40% from 45 to 64, and 11.80% who were 65 years of age or older.  The median age was 33 years. For every 100 females, there were 93.80 males.  For every 100 females age 18 and over, there were 90.50 males.

The median income for a household in the county was $32,425, and the median income for a family was $40,688. Males had a median income of $30,366 versus $21,109 for females. The per capita income for the county was $17,091.  About 11.60% of families and 15.40% of the population were below the poverty line, including 19.40% of those under age 18 and 13.40% of those age 65 or over.

Education

Public schools
Craighead County consists of eight public school districts with numerous secondary and elementary schools including:

 Jonesboro School District, including Jonesboro High School (Jonesboro) | 11 schools
 Nettleton School District, including Nettleton High School (Jonesboro) | 8 schools
 Buffalo Island Central School District, including Buffalo Island Central High School (Monette) | 4 schools
 Riverside School District, including Riverside High School (Lake City) | 4 schools
 Brookland School District, including Brookland High School (Brookland) | 3 schools
 Westside Consolidated School District, including Westside High School (Jonesboro) | 3 schools
 Bay School District, including Bay High School (Bay) | 2 schools
 Valley View School District, including Valley View High School (Jonesboro) | 2 schools

Private schools
 Ridgefield Christian School (Jonesboro) PK-12
 Blessed Sacrament School (Jonesboro) KG-6
 Concordia Christian Academy (Jonesboro) PK-6
 First Presbyterian Preschool & Kindergarten (Jonesboro) PK-KG
 Montessori School of Jonesboro (Jonesboro) PK-KG

Postsecondary education
 Arkansas State University

Communities

Cities

 Bay
 Bono
 Brookland
 Caraway
 Cash
 Jonesboro (county seat)
 Lake City (county seat)
 Monette

Towns
 Black Oak
 Egypt

Census-designated places
 Bowman

Other unincorporated communities
 Childress
 Gibson
 Herman
 Lester
 Lunsford
 Otwell

Townships

 Big Creek (Bono)
 Black Oak (Black Oak) (Caraway)
 Brookland (Brookland)
 Buffalo (Monette)
 Gilkerson (part of Jonesboro)
 Greenfield (small part of Jonesboro)
 Herndon
 Jonesboro (largest portion of Jonesboro)
 Lake City (Lake City)
 Lester
 Little Texas (small part of Cash)
 Maumelle (Bay, part of Jonesboro)
 Nettleton (part of Jonesboro)
 Powell
 Prairie
 Promised Land (Egypt)
 Taylor
 Texas (majority of Cash)

See also

 List of lakes in Craighead County, Arkansas
 National Register of Historic Places listings in Craighead County, Arkansas
 Craighead County Website.
 St. Francis River Bridge (Lake City, Arkansas)

References

 
1859 establishments in Arkansas
Jonesboro metropolitan area
Jonesboro-Paragould Combined Statistical Area
Populated places established in 1859
Sundown towns in Arkansas